Leiognathus brevirostris, commonly known as the shortnose ponyfish, is a fish of brackish and marine waters found from Indo-West Pacific to the Indian coasts and off Sri Lanka to China and south of Australia. Like its relatives, the fish is an amphidromous, demersal species which feeds on diatoms, copepods, Lucifer, nematodes and polychaetes. The fish has eight dorsal spines, sixteen dorsal soft rays, three anal spines and fourteen anal soft rays. Fresh specimens possess a golden gleam which fades with dryness.

References

External links
Classification
Biology and fishery of Leiognathus brevirostris (Valenciennes) from the Palk Bay and the Gulf of Mannar
Shortnose ponyfish
Observations on the diet of the silverbelly Leiognathus brevirostris (Valenciennes 1835) from Kerala coast

Fish of the Pacific Ocean
Fish of the Indian Ocean
Bioluminescent fish
Fish described in 1835
brevirostris